"Si la vie est cadeau" ("If Life Is a Gift") by Jean-Pierre Millers (music) and Alain Garcia (lyrics) was the winner of the Eurovision Song Contest 1983, performed in French by French singer Corinne Hermès for .

The song is a dramatic ballad dealing with the wonder of life, likening it to a gift. The lyrics tell of the singer's suffering in love with a man "who promised [her] the whole world" and did not follow through: "what about the child I wanted to give to you in the spring?". She then sings that any kind of gift is welcome, whether it be given, stolen or returned, and warns that the good times are too short, implying that the listener should savor them for all they are worth. Hermès also recorded the song in English and German, as "Words of Love" and "Liebe gibt und nimmt" ("Love gives and takes") respectively.

The song was performed 20th (last) on the night, following 's Pas de Deux with "Rendez-vous". At the close of voting, it had received 142 points, placing 1st in a field of 20.

Compared to the previous years' Eurovision winners, "Si la vie est cadeau" proved to be only a moderate commercial success, peaking at #2 in France; #3 in Belgium; #12 in Ireland; #13 in Sweden; #14 in Switzerland; #19 in the Netherlands, and failing to chart in most other European countries.
 
The song was succeeded in 1984 as winner of the contest by Herreys representing  with "Diggi-Loo Diggi-Ley". It was succeeded as Luxembourgish representative at the 1984 contest by Sophie Carle with "100% d'amour".

The Finnish rendering "Lahjan sain" was recorded by Lea Laven being the title cut of her 1983 album release.

External links
 Official Eurovision Song Contest site, history by year, 1983
 Detailed info & lyrics, The Diggiloo Thrush, "Si la vie est cadeau"

References

1983 songs
Eurovision songs of 1983
Eurovision songs of Luxembourg
Eurovision Song Contest winning songs
Polydor Records singles
PolyGram singles